Lawrence Franks Jr. (September 12, 1987 – June 26, 2020), better known by his stage name Huey, was an American rapper from St. Louis, Missouri. Originally signed to Jive Records, Franks was best known for his 2006 debut single, "Pop, Lock & Drop It".

Early life
Lawrence Franks Jr. was born on September 12, 1987, in Kinloch, Missouri, where he was raised. He moved to the Walnut Park neighborhood of St. Louis when he was five and returned to St. Louis County as a teenager. In an interview, he remembered his community as having "a lot of drugs going on and, of course, a little bit of violence" and said that his experiences growing up in a tough area inspired his rap lyrics. Franks, the youngest of four children, recalled his childhood being "really rough" and stated "My mama and daddy were on drugs. My brother was in and out of jail. The foster people were chasing me. It was crazy".

Career

Music beginnings
At age 15, Huey began creating hip hop beats. His older brother referred Franks to producer Angela Richardson, who was creating a rap group. Franks began performing as Huey, and his songs "Oh" and "Pop, Lock & Drop It" became local favorites among DJs and promoters. Huey was featured on a series of mixtapes, one of which, Unsigned Hype, sold out of its run of 8,000 copies and was noticed by producer TJ Chapman, who introduced the rapper to Vice President of A&R at Jive Records, Mickey "MeMpHiTz" Wright, in 2006.

2006–2007: Notebook Paper
Huey's debut album for the label, Notebook Paper, was released in mid-2007, described by AllMusic as sounding like a mixture of Nelly, Chingy, and Ludacris. The album reached number 26 on the Billboard 200 chart and number 10 on the Top R&B/Hip-Hop Albums chart. "Pop, Lock & Drop It", its lead single, peaked at number 6 on the Billboard Hot 100, becoming his biggest hit to date. Nelly's refusal to work with Huey on his debut album prompted two diss tracks "Down, Down, Baby" featuring Tha Camp Boyz and "Back at Cha'". Notebook Paper'''s next single was "When I Hustle" featuring singer Lloyd. In 2007, Huey was featured on the song "Hook it Up" on R Kelly's album Double Up.2010: Redemption
Huey's second album, Redemption, was released on September 14, 2010, after many delays. The first official single from the album was "Smile and Wave", which features Dorrough and was released on June 15, 2010. In "Smile and Wave", Huey criticizes his critics.

2013–2020: Project H
In 2013 Huey announced that he had officially signed with Waka Flocka Flame's label Brick Squad Monopoly and was working on his third album. On May 14, 2014, Huey released his mixtape entitled Project H''. However, not much materialized from his signing to Brick Squad and Huey had been relatively quiet on the music scene in recent years. According to music executive William "Quayshaun" Carter, who worked with Huey in the 2010s, prior to his death, Huey had just started a business in upscale clothing, "and it was working out, and he was happy".

Death
On June 25, 2020, Franks and an unidentified 21-year old male companion were shot in front of Franks' home in Kinloch, Missouri. Both men were hospitalized, but the following day Franks died from his wounds at age 32.

Discography

Albums

Mixtapes

Singles

See also
 List of murdered hip hop musicians

References 

1987 births
2020 deaths
1017 Brick Squad artists
21st-century American male musicians
21st-century American rappers
African-American male rappers
Deaths by firearm in Missouri
EMI Records artists
Jive Records artists
Midwest hip hop musicians
People from St. Louis County, Missouri
Rappers from St. Louis
Murdered African-American people
21st-century African-American musicians
20th-century African-American people